Orazio Russo (born 6 October 1973) is an Italian professional football coach and a former player. He spent most of his career playing for Sicilian giants Catania and announced his retirement on May 15, 2010.

Early career
He was born in Misterbianco, near Catania, where he grew up. His first team was S.S. Battiati, which plays in Sant'Agata li Battiati. His trainer Enzo Fazio trusted in him and when he was 15 years old he became the leader of the senior team. At the age of 18, he was bought by Calcio Catania. He played in the youth team until 1992, when, then coach, Giuseppe Caramanno called him for the Serie C1 team.

Calcio Catania
After his move to Calcio Catania he played 5 matches during his first Serie C1 season, but in the 1992–1993 season he played 25 matches, scoring 2 goals.

US Lecce
In July 1993, Russo was sold by Calcio Catania to U.S. Lecce. He played his first match in Serie A against A.C. Milan: 1–0, on 29 August 1993. Nedo Sonetti, his coach, chose him for the starting lineup and Russo didn't disappoint his coach, however, by the end of the season Lecce was relegated.  During the following summer, Orazio Russo made a tournée in United States with Internazionale, playing just friendlies. He came back to U.S. Lecce after this short experience. Lecce was relegated again in 1995, but in 1996 they won Serie C1. During his 3-season stay at US Lecce, Russo managed 79 appearances, scoring 3 goals.

Return to Catania
In 1996 Russo returned to Calcio Catania, in Serie C2.  However the season ended with the team losing in the promotion play-off against F.C. Turris.  This loss, caused the team to remain in the Italian fourth tier for one more season. During his second spell with Catania, Russo appeared in 30 official league matches, scoring 3 goals.

SPAL - FC Savoia
Orazio Russo then joined SPAL in 1997 and in his lone season with the club, he scored just 1 goal in 23 matches. In 1998, he moved to Football Club Savoia 1908. He would go on to score 4 goals in 26 official league matches for the club in his single season. He won two championships, however his trainers didn't choose him for the starting lineup.

S.S.D. Acireale Calcio 1946
In 1999, Russo moved back to Sicily with S.S.D. Acireale Calcio 1946. He became a key player for the Serie C club, in which he would remain a starter during the majority of his stay. Russo would remain at the club for 5 total seasons, the longest stay at a single club, in his career. He appeared for the club in nearly 200 total matches in all competitions, scoring 38 goals (30 of which were in the league).
His president, Antonino Pulvirenti, became his close friend and both worked to bring this team to Serie B after they started from Serie C2 in 1999. In 2000 they lost the promotion play-off against L'Aquila Calcio. In 2001 and 2002, the team risked relegation, however, in 2003, Acireale won the championship. The following season, Acireale were relegated from Serie B after losing the relegation play-off against Viterbese.

Third spell with Catania
In 2004, Pulvirenti bought Calcio Catania, in a plan to bring the Serie C1 club all the way to the Serie A. In summer 2004, Orazio Russo along with several other players of S.S.D. Acireale Calcio 1946 were purchased by Calcio Catania. The first year in Serie B was difficult for the team, who was trained by Maurizio Costantini and eventually replaced by Nedo Sonetti, yet Russo had a fairly strong season. After finishing runner-up in the 2005–2006 Serie B season, Calcio Catania was promoted to the Serie A in May 2006. In his third spell with the Eastern Sicilian giants, Russo managed 58 appearances with 4 goals, two of which helped his team win promotion, however he left Catania in August 2006 to play for Calcio Padova.

Calcio Padova
Russo joined Serie C1 side Calcio Padova in August 2006. He would remain with the club for 2 seasons making 49 appearances and scoring 4 goals. The club was neither promoted nor relegated during his time with the team.

Perugia Calcio
On 27 August 2008, Russo transferred to fellow Serie C1 side (now known as the Lega Pro Prima Divisione). He would only make 4 appearances in his first four months with the club, scoring no goals, and hence, Russo terminated his contract mutually on 26 November 2008.

Gela Calcio
After his mutual contract recision with Perugia Calcio, Russo signed for Lega Pro Seconda Divisione club Gela Calcio, where he would play from January 2009 until February 2010. Russo appeared just 12 times during this spell, partly due to injury, and scored just one goal.

Fourth joining of Calcio Catania
On 1 February 2010, Orazio Russo returned to the first professional club of his career, Calcio Catania. It is his fourth spell with the Sicilian giants. He was the second purchase of the winter transfer market for the club and its president Antonino Pulvirenti. Under current coach Siniša Mihajlović, Catania has been aiming for a top 10 finish in the Italian Serie A. Russo has yet to make an official appearance for the club, while Maxi Lopez (the other winter transfer), appeared regularly in the starting eleven, scoring 12 goals in 17 matches.

He made his first and only appearance with Catania in the final game of the season against Genoa C.F.C., which also marked his first Serie A appearance with his hometown team and his last game as a professional footballer, as he had announced his retirement at the end of the campaign.

International career
Russo represented his country for the Italy U-21 Serie C, coached by Roberto Boninsegna. He also played some matches with the Italian military national team.

Coaching career
After retirement, he accepted to stay as part of the Catania coaching staff. Since then, he took on several roles at the club, both as first team assistant and youth coach. On 21 October 2019 he was appointed caretaker manager of the main squad after the dismissal of Andrea Camplone. His caretaking spell ended on 22 October 2019 with the hiring of Cristiano Lucarelli.

References

External links
 
 Orazio Russo at Fantagol.105.net 
 

1973 births
Living people
People from Misterbianco
Catania S.S.D. players
Italian footballers
Association football forwards
Footballers from Sicily
U.S. Lecce players
Calcio Padova players
A.C. Perugia Calcio players
S.P.A.L. players
S.S.D. Acireale Calcio 1946 players
Serie A players
Serie B players
Serie C players
Italian football managers
Catania S.S.D. managers
Serie C managers
Sportspeople from the Province of Catania